is a private university in Tendo, Yamagata, Japan, established in 1982. The predecessor of the school, a training school for kindergarten teachers, was founded in 1965.

Names of Academic department 
 Childhood studies

Advanced course 
 Major of Personal Care Assistant studies

External links
 Official website 

Educational institutions established in 1965
Private universities and colleges in Japan
Universities and colleges in Yamagata Prefecture
Japanese junior colleges
1965 establishments in Japan
Tendō, Yamagata